Aulacophora coffeae is a species of beetles in the family Chrysomelidae.

Among its host plants seem to be melons.

Description
The head, labrum, ventral surfaces and legs are black, with a brownish pronotum and elytra.

Distribution
This species is native to Southeast Asia, and has been found from Thailand to Indonesia.

References

coffeae
Beetles described in 1788
Beetles of Asia